Iperu may refer to:

 Iperú, the Peru tourism office
 Iperu, Ogun, a town in Ogun State, southwestern Nigeria